This article contains the list of candidates associated with the 2000 Russian presidential election.

A total of 33 candidates were nominated; 15 submitted the application forms to the Central Electoral Committee, and ultimately 12 candidates were registered.

Registered candidates
Candidates are listed in the order they appear on the ballot paper (alphabetical order in Russian).

Withdrawn candidates

Rejected nominations

Declared candidates who withdrew without registering

Possible candidates who did not run
The following individuals were included in some polls, were referred to in the media as possible candidates or had publicly expressed interest long before the elections but never announced that they would run.

Viktor Anpilov
Dmitry Ayatskov
Sergey Baburin
Alexander Barkashov
Vladimir Bryntsalov
Viktor Chernomyrdin
Anatoly Chubais
Yegor Gaidar
Mikhail Gorbachev
Tatyana Dyachenko
Boris Fyodorov
Svyatoslav Fyodorov
Ilyukhin
Anatoly Kulikov
Mikhail Lapshin
Alexander Lebed
Alexander Lukashenko
Yury Luzhkov
Albert Makashov
Boris Nemtsov
 Nikolaev
Yevgeny Primakov
Alla Pugacheva
Alexander Rutskoy
Eduard Rossel
Gennady Seleznyov
Sergey Shoygu
Martin Shakkum
Yuri Skokov
Anatoly Sobchak (died 20 February 2000)
Aleksandr Solzhenitsyn
Sergei Stepashin
Yegor Stroyev
Sysoyev
Nikolai Travkin
Boris Yeltsin -constitutionally barred from running

References

 
2000